Exhibition station may refer to:

 Exhibition railway station, Brisbane, Australia
 Exhibition GO Station in Toronto, Canada
 Wembley Exhibition railway station in London, England (1923–1969)

See also
 Exhibition Centre station (disambiguation)
 Convention and Exhibition Center station (disambiguation)